James Benson (1845 – August 4, 1890) was a United States Navy sailor and a recipient of the United States military's highest decoration, the Medal of Honor.

Biography
A native of Denmark, Benson joined the U.S. Navy from Yokohama, Japan. On that day, he jumped overboard and attempted to rescue Landsman John K. Smith from drowning. For this action, he was awarded the Medal of Honor four months later, on October 10.

Benson's official Medal of Honor citation reads:
On board the U.S.S. Ossipee, 20 June 1872. Risking his life, Benson leaped into the sea while the ship was going at a speed of 4 knots and endeavored to save John K. Smith, landsman, of the same vessel, from drowning.

Benson left the Navy while still a seaman. He died on August 4, 1890, at age 44 or 45 and was buried at Woodlawn Cemetery in Everett, Massachusetts.

See also

List of Medal of Honor recipients in non-combat incidents

References

External links

1845 births
1890 deaths
Danish emigrants to the United States
United States Navy sailors
United States Navy Medal of Honor recipients
Foreign-born Medal of Honor recipients
Non-combat recipients of the Medal of Honor